Alatangana is one of two creator deities of the Kono people of Guinea; the other is Sa. Alatangana came to the world of Sa, took soil from a swamp to create land, and then placed vegetation on it. He fell in love with Sa's daughter, and asked Sa if he could marry her. Sa refused, but Alatangana eloped with her anyway, and they had seven sons and seven daughters.

References

Bibliography
In the Beginning: Creation Stories from Around the World by Virginia Hamilton, 1991, HMH Books for Young Readers,

Sources
Gly.uga.edu

Creator gods
African gods